CHD Group is an Indian non-profit global health organisation based in Mangalore. Founded in 2014, CHD Group works in the field of public health, disaster management, primary healthcare, road safety, women's health, skill development, monitoring and evaluation of programmes, implementing CSR programmes for corporate companies and livelihood for rural communities and partners with other Indian and foreign organisations, government ministries, diplomatic missions, United Nation agencies for capacity development, supportive supervision, technical support, CSR programme implementation and strengthening public health systems.

The organisation advocated for a more robust public health bill in 2017, and also released the Karnataka Mental Health Report-2019 that gave the landscape of mental health situation in the state. During the Covid-19 pandemic, the NGO supported over 50,000 farmers by providing PPE in partnership with Corteva agriscience and also donated oxygen concentrators to BBMP Hospitals by importing them from China totally impacting over 4,56,000 in the middle of a lockdown alone. The organization received a Special Consultative Status to the United Nations Economic and Social Council (ECOSOC) in 2021 and has impacted in total over 2.5 million lives in India and around the world.

Educational institution 
On 29 March 2022, CHD Group officially inaugurated & started the Edward & Cynthia Institute of Public Health(ECIPH). ECIPH is a full fledged academic education institute at Bajal in Mangalore that provides a specialized higher education degree programme in Masters in Public Health(MPH)

Advocacy and work reception 
In the year 2014, CHD Group pressurized the District Administration of Dakshina Kannada to book violators for seat belt and enforce seat belt as a compulsion for drivers in the city of Mangalore and the district of Dakshina Kannada. To this effect, the Deputy Commissioner then, issued an order to implement seat belt for drivers with immediate effect.

CHD Group partnered with Godrej Industries to support families who were struck by disasters during Gujarat Floods 2017 and supported them through medical relief work.

In 2018, CHD Group led a US Government delegation to Chief Minister Kumaraswamy and also motivated him to set up a disaster management and nutrition task force in the state with sub-district governance mechanisms. In the 2019 Karnataka Mental Health Report, the organization stated that Raichur had the highest cases of mental disorder followed by Bidar and proposed several solutions to the Government of Karnataka.

During Cyclone Fani 2019, they provided multi-specialty medical relief working with All India Institute of Medical Sciences, Bhubaneshwar, Odisha.

Special projects 
CHD Group runs Mission ICU, a citizen- driven initiative to build  critical care capacities of India's public hospitals. Until now they have installed over 150 plus beds and ventilators across various district hospitals, the latest being in Tamenglong, Manipur in India.

The Family Pillar Alliance ( FPK) is a programme run by CHD Group supported majorly by National Bank for Agriculture and Rural Development and KANTAR to provide sustainable livelihood in the domain of hospital duty assistants and nursing aides as caregivers for families in India and around the world.

Empanelment, membership, signatory 
Empaneled and registered with Niti Aayog, International Labour Organization, UNICEF, Foreign Contribution (Regulation) Act, 2010, Data Universal Numbering System, Income Tax

Signatory to the  Fossil Fuels Non-Proliferation Treaty

Member of the Climate Action Network South Asia

Observership to United Nations Framework Convention on Climate Change.

Awards 

In the year 2020, CHD Group won the ASSOCHAM NGO Award for speedy response to community needs.

BW Businessworld 40 under 40 award in 2021.

Foundation Day themes 
7th Foundation Day 2021 - " Reclaiming gains for accelerating global health " and the Keynote address was given by Dr. Yogan Pillay, Former Deputy Director General of Health, Government of South Africa.

8th Foundation Day 2022 - " Public health in all policies for community development" - His Excellency Mr. Federico Salas, Ambassador of Mexico to India delivered the Keynote address & Dr. Harsha Somaroo, President, Public Health Association of South Africa was the Guest of Honor.

See also 

 List of organizations with consultative status to the United Nations Economic and Social Council

References 

2014 establishments in India
Medical and health organisations based in India
Non-governmental organizations
Organisations based in Mangalore
Organizations established in 2014
Public health organisations based in India